Turkey competed at the 1960 Winter Olympics in Squaw Valley, United States. Turkish athletes competed in the Men's Alpine Downhill, Men's Alpine Giant Slalom, and Men's Alpmin Slalom events.

Zeki Samiloğlu came in 54th place out of 65 participants in the Men's Giant Slalom.
Zeki Samiloğlu also finished in 58th place out of 63 participants in the Men's Downhill.
Muzaffer Demirhan was disqualified in the Men's Downhill competition.

Zeki Samiloğlu finished 39th out of 63 participants in the Men's Slalom (40 non-disqualified).
Muzaffer Demirhan also disqualified in the Men's Slalom.

Alpine skiing

Men

References
Official Olympic Reports
 Olympic Winter Games 1960, full results by sports-reference.com

Nations at the 1960 Winter Olympics
1960
1960 in Turkish sport